Rashad Smith may refer to:

Rashad Smith (producer) (born 1972), American hip-hop and R&B artist
Rashad Smith (American football) (born 1997), American football player
Rashad Smith (footballer) (born 1996), Bajan football player